Kadoma, originally known as Gatooma, is a town in Zimbabwe.

Location
The city is located in Kadoma District, Mashonaland West Province, one of the 10 administrative provinces in Zimbabwe.

Overview
The city is at the centre of a mining area, which provides gold, copper and nickel. Cam and Motor is the largest gold producer in Zimbabwe's history. Under the present regime, Cam and Motor is owned by Rio Tinto Zimbabwe.  

Cotton is grown in the area and there was some development of related industries before 1990. The David Whithead Textile manufacturing company was opened in 1952. 

ZB Bank Limited, a commercial bank, maintains a branch in the city. Another commercial bank, Royal Bank Zimbabwe, also maintains a branch here.
Kadoma is also a peaceful town.

History
The city of Kadoma was known as Gatooma until 1982. Gatooma was founded in the 1890s as a mining camp, and constituted under a village management board in 1907. The settlement was named after the nearby kraal of Chief Katuma, who is represented on the town's coat of arms by the mountain bearing his name and the chief's badge of office.

The Specks Hotel was opened in 1907, and Jameson High School started the same year when Amelia Fitt, wife of the first mayor of Kadoma, started to give classes to the town children in her house. 

In 1917 Gatooma Municipality was created. 

A public electricity supply was introduced in Kadoma in 1922. 

The Grand Hotel opened in 1925 and had a sprung floor for dancing, the first such floor in Zimbabwe.

In the 1970's Gatooma held highland games which was attended by the Salisbury Caledonian Society Pipe Band, Churchill School Pipe Band from Salisbury and the Northlea School Pipe Band from Bulawayo.

Population
In 2004, the population of the city was estimated at 79,174. The population of Kadoma was estimated at 77,749 in 2012.

In the 1969 census its population totalled 20,940, of whom 1,879 were white and 18,740 were African. 
In 1975 the population was estimated at 33,000, of whom approximately 2700 were white.

Climate

Sister city
The city of Kadoma is twinned with Stevenage in the United Kingdom.

See also
 Rio Tinto Group
 Economy of Zimbabwe

References

Kadoma District
Populated places in Mashonaland West Province